Nigel Alan Marven (born 27 November 1960) is a British wildlife TV presenter, naturalist, conservationist, author, and television producer. He is best known as presenter of the BBC miniseries Chased by Dinosaurs, its sequel, Sea Monsters, as well as the ITV miniseries Prehistoric Park. He is also known for his unorthodox, spontaneous, and daring style of presenting wildlife documentaries as well as for including factual knowledge in the proceedings.

Career

Early life
Marven was born in Barnet but grew up in St. Albans. As a child he loved animals. His first pet was a hamster called Hummy. He kept stick insects, boa constrictors and even an eel in a bath. When he was 15, he also owned young spectacled caiman. Nigel studied botany and zoology at the University of Bristol until the age of 22 when he left to begin his career at the BBC Natural History Unit in Bristol.

Becoming producer and TV presenter (1982-1999) 
From 1982 to the mid-1990s, Nigel first worked as a wildlife documentary researcher for such programmes as The First Eden and My Family and Other Animals. He then went on to begin producing nature documentary series, one of the first being Realms of the Russian Bear in 1992.  He enjoyed a 12-year professional collaboration with the natural historian David Attenborough, whom he holds in high esteem. In 1998, he moved to ITV where he was asked to present wildlife documentaries as well as produce them.

In his first television series for ITV, Giants, he swam with a great white shark without the protection of a cage. Other scenes included a goliath birdeater spider, arguably the largest spider in the world, walking over his face, and Marven grappling a fifteen-foot African rock python deep in its underground lair. This style of presenting has won him many viewers and to date he has presented more than 50 wildlife programs and series for TV.

Shark Week and prehistory programmes (2000–2009)

In 2000, Nigel became the host of the hit annual Discovery Channel event Shark Week, and held this role for three years. In 2002, the Impossible Pictures production company asked Nigel to present the Walking with Dinosaurs Special episodes "The Giant Claw" and "Land of Giants", which premiered on BBC One to nearly seven million viewers in late 2002. In 2003, Nigel also hosted a sequel miniseries, Sea Monsters – A Walking with Dinosaurs Trilogy, which was an even bigger success. He then continued his partnership with Impossible Pictures as the studio moved on to ITV, beginning with Prehistoric Park in 2006, a fictional series about travelling back in time to rescue examples of extinct creatures such as Tyrannosaurus, Woolly Mammoth, Arthropleura and others. In his final appearance for Impossible Pictures, Marven went on to be featured as himself in season 3, episode 4 of the ITV action drama series Primeval, which aired in 2009. He is seen playing with a baby Velociraptor, before encountering a Giganotosaurus, which, it is implied, eats him off-screen.

In addition to being presenter for Impossible Pictures's time-travelling programmes, Marven also founded his own independent company Image Impact in 2003, and started producing his own wildlife films, including a few one-hour specials and then miniseries, such as Penguin Safari and Panda Adventure, both which aired on Channel 5 and Animal Planet. In 2007, he also worked with Tigress Productions which resulted in his shows Shark Island and Jaguar Adventure.

Ten Deadliest Snakes and other nature programmes (2010–2020)
In the first half of the 2010s, Nigel produced nature documentaries such as Untamed China, Wild Colombia, Whale Adventure and Nigel Marven's Cruise Ship Adventures, the latter which was broadcast in May and June 2015 on Watch.

During the summer of 2014, Eden Channel in the UK started a new competition for aspiring wildlife filmmakers called Eden Shorts. The task was to make one-minute videos with animals, with the best ones to be shown on TV. Nigel Marven, along with Michaela Strachan, were judges. Nigel has also made some short how-to-guides, available through Eden Channel's website. In May 2015, Eden premiered a film called Eden Shorts: From Lens to Screen presented by Marven. In the show, he meets competition finalists and reveals techniques used to shoot their videos.

One of his more recent successes, Ten Deadliest Snakes, was first broadcast on Animal Planet in the United States in spring 2014, and on Eden in the UK in June of the same year. Season 2 of Ten Deadliest Snakes premiered in autumn 2015 on Eden, while season 3 began airing on 5 January 2017 on Nat Geo Wild in the UK. Highlights of Ten Deadliest Snakes included, among others, visiting sea krait caves in South China Sea, handling black mamba in South Africa, snake-hunting with Steve Irwin's son Robert in the billabongs of Australia Zoo and visiting the Brazilian island of Queimada Grande, home of the golden lancehead with a scientific expedition.

In January 2018, Nigel's Untamed Philippines was screened on Nat Geo Wild in the USA. The presenter-led version of this documentary called Wild Philippines with Nigel Marven aired on Viasat Nature in Europe in March and April 2018 and on Animal Planet India in June 2018, with the American TV channel PBS airing the series in late summer 2019.

As of November 2022, Nigel Marven's newest nature series is Wild Central America, a documentary miniseries consisting of four episodes, each looking at wildlife of a different Central American country, with focus on Honduras, Costa Rica, Guatemala and Panama. While Wild Honduras premiered on Viasat Nature in central and eastern Europe in summer 2019, the rest of the series was first broadcast on the same channel in late spring and summer 2020. The presenter-less version of Wild Costa Rica and Wild Guatemala premiered on Nat Geo Wild in February 2020.

Return to prehistoric media and other wildlife documentaries (2020-present)
In September 2020, Blue Meridian and Crytivo released the official trailer for the video game Prehistoric Kingdom, featuring Nigel Marven as narrator. On 30 September, the day after the trailer's release, the creative team behind the game confirmed in a live stream that they had approached Nigel to narrate the trailer after they saw that he followed the game's official page on Twitter. In May 2021, he confirmed on his Twitter account that he was recording voice-over for the game. Marven also voiced the Early Access Trailer for the game, which was released on the 21st of April, 2022. The game, featuring Nigel Marven's voiceover commentary, was released on 27 April 2022.

In July 2021, Minecraft addon creator CompyCraft released a trailer for a Minecraft dinosaur expansion pack, which featured Nigel Marven's voiceover. The project was named The Giant Dinosaur Adventure, and was confirmed to be featuring Nigel Marven's character inside the game itself. The Giant Dinosaur Adventure later released on 27th September 2022 on the in-game Minecraft store.

Nigel is set to narrate the upcoming independent documentary project Forgotten Bloodlines: Agate, which will take place during the Miocene epoch. It was originally slated for release in 2022 but was later pushed to a yet-to-be-announced date.

In 2022, Marven partnered with MagellanTV to produce a one-hour documentary titled Wild El Salvador — In the Shadow of the Volcanoes with Nigel Marven. The film was released on 2 March 2023 as part of MagellanTV's celebration of World Wildlife Day.

Close encounters 
Marven was bitten by a venomous green pit viper in East Malaysian state Sabah in the summer 2014 during filming the first episode of the show called Eating Wild. The snake bit him on the thumb but did not inject too much venom, so Marven spent 6 hours in the hospital, until he had recovered. He has also had a few other very dangerous encounters with venomous snakes. While he was producing the BBC film The Serpent's Embrace in 1980s, a spitting cobra sprayed its venom into his eyes. He spent 2–3 days in hospital, though luckily the venom did not enter his blood. A similar encounter happened in December 2008 while Marven was making a short film about black-necked spitting cobras for Webosaurs. Though he wore a mask, the cobra venom landed in Marven's hair, then mixed with sweat and ran into his eyes, so he stopped the filming until next morning. In his 2008 series Jaguar Adventure he was bitten by a mildly toxic venomous false water cobra. His hand swelled up within ten minutes, but there were no other harmful effects.

In his 2004 nature documentary Bull Shark: World's Deadliest Shark Nigel Marven was in Bahamas and stood with shark expert Erich Ritter in the water surrounded by sharks. During the filming, a bull shark attacked Ritter's leg and gave him a 30 centimetre bite to his calf. Marven still recalls it as one of the most dangerous moments in his career.

In 2005, while filming the Indian rhinoceros in Kaziranga National Park, Marven and his crew unknowingly got too close to a female rhino with a small calf; the mother rhino charged at them, but since they were riding in a truck, they were able to outdistance her. Marven later said that this experience was the most exciting moment in his entire film-making career.

In the third episode of his 2012 series, Wild Colombia, Marven was bitten by a non-venomous Central American tree boa on his nose, causing blood to cover his face. A similar encounter happened in his 2013 show Ten Deadliest Snakes: China with a king ratsnake. Likewise, in Ten Deadliest Snakes: Brazil from 2017, he got bitten on the nose by a non-venomous green vine snake.

Conservation
Nigel ran the 2008 London marathon in 4 hours and 4 minutes to try to raise £20,000 for the Whale and Dolphin Conservation Society UK.

He is a Panda Ambassador for Chengdu Panda Base in Sichuan Province, China. He is also a patron of The Great Fen Project for restoring vital wildlife habitat, Healthy Planet through which he adopted a plot of land for helping to create new wildlife habitats, and Vale Wildlife Hospital, company that treats injured wildlife in Gloucestershire, England. He is also a patron of the ORCA organization, which protects whales and dolphins in European waters.

Many of his TV wildlife programmes also seek to highlight the conservation of nature and endangered species. For example, his series Panda Adventure provides a look at giant panda breeding program in Chengdu Panda Base in China and in San Diego Zoo in the US. In the third episode of Season 3 of Ten Deadliest Snakes, he covered the Kemp's ridley sea turtle conservation project in Tamaulipas, Mexico.

In 2016, Nigel Marven produced and narrated a short film featuring the work of Black Mamba Anti-Poaching Unit, who are fighting against rhino poaching in South Africa. The film is available to watch via internet and is presented by animal campaigner Anneka Svenska.

Awards and honours
Nigel Marven was nominated for BAFTA TV Awards in 2000 for Best Features in his first presenter-led series, Giants.

In 2015, he was nominated for Donald Gosling Award by Maritime Media Awards for his series Nigel Marven's Cruise Ship Adventures.

In 2016, he received award from Cruise Lines International Association.

In 2022, a species of Cretaceous spathiopterygid wasp described by Maxime Santer and his colleagues was named Diameneura marveni in honor of Nigel Marven "for his appearances in several palaeontology documentaries".

Personal life 
Nigel Marven married Jenny Hull in September 1996, but they separated four years later. Nigel fathered Jane Braham's son, Theo, but went on to marry Gillian Impey on 1 May 2004. They also have a child.  During The Wright Stuff on 14 July 2017 Nigel announced he is currently going through his second divorce. His children are one son Theo and daughter Eleonora.

During a simulated dinosaur encounter in the third episode of Prehistoric Park, Marven declared himself a vegetarian. Throughout the series he applies the same term to naturally herbivorous animals. In the second episode of the Untamed China series, he says the team cooked vegetarian food especially for him. Nigel confirms he is a vegetarian on his official website by stating that the Peregrine falcon is his favourite animal and that he would love to be such a bird, but because he is a vegetarian eating raw pigeon would make that hard. In Panda Adventure Marven states that he is "usually teetotal" when having a celebratory drink with a team of Chinese trackers who led him to see pandas close-up in the wild.

Filmography 
Realms of the Russian Bear (1992)
Incredible Journeys (1997)
Wildlife of Iran: Secrets of the North (1998)
Giants (1999)
Shark Week (2000–02)
Bloodsuckers (2000)
Giant Creepy Crawlies (2001)
Big Cats (2001)
Nigel's Wild Wild World (2001–02)
Rats (2002)
Alligators (2002)
 Chased by Dinosaurs (2002)
 A Walking with Dinosaurs' Special: The Giant Claw (2002)
 A Walking with Dinosaurs' Special: Land of Giants (2002)
 Sea Monsters: A Walking with Dinosaurs Trilogy or Chased by Sea Monsters (2003)
 Nigel Marven Nature Specials (2003–04)
 Anacondas (2003)
 Piranhas (2003)
Bull Sharks (2004)
Meerkats (2003)
The Human Senses (2003)
King of the Jungle (2003)
Extreme Animal Attacks (2003)
Scream! If You Want to Get Off (2004)
Nigel Marven's Animal Detectives (2005)
Nigel Marven's Venom Hunters (2005)
Britain's Finest: Natural Wonders (2005)
Rhinos (2006)
Ugly Animals (2006)
Prehistoric Park (2006)
Penguin Week with Nigel Marven (2006)
Micro Safari: Journey to the Bugs (2007)
Killer Whale Islands (2007)
Hider in the House (2007 - on Week 20)
Arctic Exposure (2007) USA
Polar Bear Week with Nigel Marven (2007)
Shark Island with Nigel Marven (2007) 
Jaguar Adventure with Nigel Marven (2008)
Help! I'm No Bigger Than a Bug (2008)
Weird, True & Freaky Shark Attacks (2008)
Primeval - Episode 3.4 (2009) UK
Invasion of the Giant Pythons: Florida with Nigel Marven (2009) UK
Panda Week with Nigel Marven (2010) UK
Untamed China with Nigel Marven (2011) UK
Yunnan Adventure with Nigel Marven (2012) (UKTV Eden)
Hainan Adventure with Nigel Marven (2012) (UKTV Eden)
Great Animal Escapes (2012)
Wild Colombia with Nigel Marven (2012) UK
Whale Adventure with Nigel Marven (2013) UK
Ten Deadliest Snakes with Nigel Marven: China (2013)
My Family & Other Turkeys with Nigel Marven (2013) UK
Ten Deadliest Snakes with Nigel Marven (2014)
Eating Wild (2014) (AFC)
Nigel Marven's Cruise Ship Adventures (2015)
Eden Shorts: From Lens to Screen (2015)
Ten Deadliest Snakes with Nigel Marven: Series 2 (2015)
Ten Deadliest Snakes with Nigel Marven: Series 3 (2016)
Wild Philippines with Nigel Marven (2017)
Wild Central America (2019-2020)
Wild Honduras (2019)
Wild Costa Rica (2020)
Wild Guatemala (2020)
Wild Panama (2020)
University Challenge Christmas 2022 Episode 7 (2022)
Wild El Salvador — In the Shadow of the Volcanoes with Nigel Marven (2023)
Forgotten Bloodlines: Agate (upcoming)
Wild Slovakia with Nigel Marven (upcoming)

Video games 
 Webosaurs (2009)
 Minecraft: The Giant Dinosaur Adventure with Nigel Marven (2022)
 Prehistoric Kingdom (2022)

Bibliography 
 Identifying snakes: the new compact study guide and identifier - by Ken Preston-Mafham, Nigel Marven and Rob Harvey, Chartwell Books, 1996, 
 Incredible Journeys - BBC Books, 1997, 
 Giants - Collins, 1999, 
 Around the World Making Wildlife Films - Oxford University Press, 2000, 
 Nigel Marven’s Animal Vampires - Scholastic, 2000, 
 Nigel Marven’s Giant Creepy Crawlies - Scholastic, 2000, 
 Sea Monsters by Nigel Marven and Jasper James - BBC Books, 2003, 167 pages, hardback
 Walking with Cavemen by John Lynch and Louise Barrett, with foreword written by Nigel Marven - DK Adult, 224 pages, 2003, hardback
 Bugs, Beetles, Spiders Snakes Complete Identifier - by Ken Preston-Mafham, Nigel Marven and Rob Harvey, Brockhampton Press Inc., 2004, 
 Chased By Sea Monsters by Nigel Marven and Jasper James, DK ADULT, 2004, 
 Dinosaurs - Kingfisher publications 2007, 63 pages, hardback
 Prehistoric Park with Poster - adapted by Susan Evento, created by Jasper James, Meredith Books, 2007, 48 pages
 Field Guide to the Birds of Chile by Daniel E. Martínez Piña and Gonzalo E. González Cifuentes, with foreword written by Nigel Marven - Helm, 2021, 224 pages, paperback
 Return to the Wild by Danelle Murray and Brendan Murray, with foreword written by Nigel Marven - Independently published, 2022, 248 pages, paperback.

References

External links 

Official website
Animal Planet
 
UKTV Eden

1960 births
English conservationists
English naturalists
English television presenters
Living people